Juliana Esteves dos Santos (born January 27, 1984) is a Brazilian rugby sevens player. She won a bronze medal at the 2015 Pan American Games as a member of the Brazil women's national rugby sevens team. She is a member of Brazil's women's sevens squad to the 2016 Summer Olympics.

References

External links 
 

1984 births
Living people
Brazil international rugby sevens players
Female rugby sevens players
Rugby sevens players at the 2015 Pan American Games
Pan American Games bronze medalists for Brazil
Rugby sevens players at the 2016 Summer Olympics
Olympic rugby sevens players of Brazil
Pan American Games medalists in rugby sevens
Medalists at the 2015 Pan American Games
Brazilian female rugby union players
Brazil international women's rugby sevens players
Brazilian rugby sevens players